Murilo Rangel Barbosa (born 1 August 1991), known as Murilo Rangel, is a Brazilian footballer who plays as an attacking midfielder for Cuiabá.

Previously he has represented Paraná and Londrina in Campeonato Brasileiro Série B.

Although born in Brazil, Murilo Rangel made his professional debut in Uruguay, for Liverpool Fútbol Club, coming on as a substitute in a 2011 Primera División Clausura game against Racing Club de Montevideo on 20 February 2011.

References

External links
 

Living people
1991 births
Brazilian footballers
Association football midfielders
Liverpool F.C. (Montevideo) players
Londrina Esporte Clube players
Sport Club São Paulo players
Resende Futebol Clube players
Toledo Esporte Clube players
Paraná Clube players
Clube Atlético Linense players
Joinville Esporte Clube players
Central Sport Club players
Grêmio Esportivo Brasil players
Associação Atlética Internacional (Limeira) players
Guarani FC players
Grêmio Novorizontino players
Cuiabá Esporte Clube players
Campeonato Brasileiro Série B players
Campeonato Brasileiro Série D players
Uruguayan Primera División players